Michelle Morgan may refer to:
 Michelle Morgan (actress) (born 1981), Canadian film and television actress
 Michele Morgan (actress) (born 1970), American film, television and voice-over actress
 Michele Morgan (1957–1961), child murder victim
 Michèle Morgan (1920–2016), French film actress